Mulu Solomon Bezuneh is an Ethiopian businesswoman, writer and consultant, the first woman to be appointed as a president of Ethiopian chamber of commerce.

Early life 
Mulu Solomon was born in 1958 in Qarre Goha, Oromia, Ethiopia. She attended primary school in Qarre Goha (Goha mountains) primary school and she went to Fiche Secondary School. After High-school Mulu earned her Diploma at Commercial School in Addis Ababa, followed by a Bachelors of Arts in Accounting with a minor in Business Administration at Addis Ababa University. Mulu also later received her Masters of Arts in Development Studies, with a concentration in Environment and Development at Addis Ababa University.

Awards 
Mulu Solomon has received several awards including a United Nations Certificate of Merit Award of Honor; an Honorary Award from Serve the Generation Association; a Star Worker Pin from the Ethiopian Import Export Corp.(ETIMEX); an Extraordinary Leader & Manager Gold Award from D H Geda; and Addis Ababa University EiABC, Certificate of Honor for delivering high-quality teaching.

References

External links 
 Mulu Solomon Bezuneh at Ethiopian Women Unleashed

1958 births
Living people
21st-century Ethiopian women politicians
21st-century Ethiopian politicians
Ethiopian politicians
Addis Ababa University alumni